Taman Negara is a national park in Peninsular Malaysia. It was established in 1938/1939 as the King George V National Park after Theodore Hubback lobbied the sultans of Pahang, Terengganu and Kelantan to set aside a piece of land that covers the three states for the creation of a protected area. It was renamed Taman Negara after independence, which means "national park" in Malay. Taman Negara has a total area of 4,343 km2 and it is one of the world's oldest deciduous rainforests, estimated to be more than 130 million years old.

Attractions found near Kuala Tahan (where the Park headquarters for Pahang is located) include a canopy walkway, the Gua Telinga cave system, and the Lata Berkoh rapids. Visitors can experience the tropical rainforest, birdwatching or jungle trekking (e.g. Tenor Rentis) and the river views along the Tahan River, with many local resorts and hotels for visitors located nearby.

Geography

The park encompasses three states, Pahang, Kelantan and Terengganu, each with its own legislation. The Taman Negara Enactment (Pahang) No. 2 of 1939 is enforced in the state of Pahang, the Taman Negara Enactment (Kelantan) No. 14 of 1938 in the state of Kelantan and the Taman Negara Enactment (Terengganu) No. 6 of 1939 in the state of Terengganu. The enactments have similar contents.

Taman Negara Pahang is the largest at 2,477 km2, followed by Taman Negara Kelantan at 1,043 km2 and Taman Negara Terengganu at 853 km2.  At an estimated age of more than 130 million years old, it is reputed to be the "oldest tropical rainforest", although the title more accurately belongs to the Daintree Rainforest in Queensland, Australia, estimated to be between 135 million years old  and 180 million years old.

Taman Negara is mostly located on ancient, sedimentary rocks and the oldest part of the continent, it features mostly gentle rolling hills where about 57% of the total land area of the park are located below 300m above sea level due to a long time erosion. Despite that, it also features some mountainous parts of the Tahan Range, a subrange of the Tenasserim Hills. The Tahan Range is home to Mount Tahan, the highest and most prominent point in Peninsular Malaysia at about 2,187m above sea level.

The park acts as an important headwater for the states of Kelantan, Terengganu and Pahang.  There are three main river systems that originated from The park, which are the Lebir, Terengganu and Tembeling Rivers.   The Lebir is one of the tributaries of the Kelantan River, flowing northward passing through Kelantan Delta, while the Terengganu River flows eastward toward Kenyir Lake and is one of the primary inflow for the lake; and Tembeling River is one of the tributaries of the Pahang River, flowing southward towards the central valley of Pahang. These rivers ultimately discharge into the South China Sea. 

The park has been developed into an ecotourism destination in Malaysia. There are several geological and biological attractions in the park. Gunung Tahan is the highest point of the Malay Peninsula; climbers can use Kuala Tahan or Merapoh as their departure point. All visitors to the park must obtain permits from the Department of Wildlife and National Parks.

Flora
Taman Negara features a largely virgin, lowland dipterocarp rainforest as well as Peninsular Malaysian montane rain forests on the higher elevation parts of the park.

Fauna

Taman Negara is home to some rare mammals, such as the Malayan tiger, Malayan gaur (seladang) and Asian elephant. Additionally, some biologists also believe that a small population of Northern Sumatran Rhinoceros live in the park. As well as birds such as the great argus, red junglefowl, and the rare Malayan peacock-pheasant are still found here in some numbers. Tahan River has been preserved to protect the Malaysian mahseer (ikan kelah in Malay), a type of game fish. Species found in the park include 10,000 plants, 150,000 of insects, 25,000 invertebrates, 675 birds, 270 reptiles, 250 freshwater fish and 200 mammals at the national park, including some of which are rare or indigenous to Malaysia.

Transportation

Keretapi Tanah Melayu (KTM)'s KTM Intercity and Express trains stop at Jerantut railway station. Visitors to Taman Negara can disembark here.

Local tour operators arrange transportation from Kuala Lumpur to the entrance of the Park at Kuala Tahan. This may involve a 3-4 hour bus  journey to Jerantut and Kuala Tembeling Jetty followed by a 2.5 hour river boat ride to Kuala Tahan. Entrance permits and park tours are often included in the package.

From Kuala Lumpur, buses may depart from Terminal Bersepadu Selatan and Hentian Pekeliling going to the nearest town, Jerantut. From here travel to Kuala Tembeling Jetty and Kuala Tahan.

See also
 List of national parks of Malaysia
 Gunung Tahan, the highest point in Peninsular Malaysia.

References
10. ↑ KL to Taman Negara shuttle service

External links

 
 Tourism Malaysia - Taman Negara
 Department of Wildlife and National Parks
 Jerantut KTM Railway Station

National parks of Malaysia
ASEAN heritage parks
Birdwatching sites in Malaysia
Titiwangsa Mountains
Geography of Pahang
Geography of Kelantan
Geography of Terengganu
Tourist attractions in Pahang
Tourist attractions in Kelantan
Tourist attractions in Terengganu
Protected areas established in 1939
1939 establishments in British Malaya